Kazan Air Enterprise is an airline based in Kazan, Tatarstan, Russia. It operates air taxi services and aerial work. Its main base is Kazan International Airport.

History 
The airline was formerly known as Kazan 2nd Aviation Enterprise.

Fleet 
As of March 2011 the Kazan Air Enterprise fleet includes:

References

External links 

Kazan Air Enterprise

Airlines of Russia
Former Aeroflot divisions
Companies based in Kazan